Ivan Sergeyevich Kolesnikov (born March 18, 1983) is a Russian film, television, and stage actor. Nika Award's winner (2016).

Early life 
Kolesnikov was born in Moscow, Russian SFSR, Soviet Union. He is son of actor Sergei Kolesnikov.

Since 2002, he has been married to costume designer Lina Ramanauskaitė. Graduated from the Mikhail Shchepkin Higher Theatre School (course of Viktor Korshunov) in 2004. Former actor of Mossovet Theatre.

Personal life 
They have 3 children, who are all girls.

Filmography

References

External links
 

1983 births
Living people
Russian male film actors
Russian male stage actors
Russian male television actors
Russian male child  actors
Male  actors from Moscow
20th-century Russian male actors
21st-century Russian male actors
Recipients of the Nika Award